Toshiko Karasawa (7 May 1911 – 2 December 2013) was a Japanese politician for the Japanese Communist Party (JCP) and labor activist. Born in Sapporo on the island Hokkaido, Karasawa graduated from Sapporo Kita High School in 1929, and served two terms as a representative for her party for the House of Representatives, in 1946 and 1949, before retiring soon after. Karasawa died of natural causes on 2 December 2013, aged 102, at a health care facility in Toyama, Toyama.

References

1911 births
2013 deaths
People from Sapporo
Japanese centenarians
Members of the House of Representatives (Japan)
Japanese activists
Japanese Communist Party politicians
Women centenarians
20th-century Japanese women politicians
20th-century Japanese politicians